Dimitris Salpingidis (born 18 August 1981) is a Greek former professional footballer who played as a forward. He was known to be "a very quick and useful tool on the counter attack."

Club career

PAOK
Born in Zagliveri, Salpingidis started out as a Greco-Roman wrestler before discovering his calling in football. Salpingidis began his football career through the youth ranks of PAOK. Before football Salpingidis was participating in wrestling in which he was very good at, with a dream of competing in the Olympics. He didn't make it as a wrestler but his dream came true as footballer in 2004. On 30 September 1999 he marked his official debut against Lokomotivi Tbilisi with a goal in a 2–0 win. Acknowledging his potential and in order to gain much needed experience, the team soon loaned him for two successive seasons to Kavala where he finished top scorer of the Second Division. His plea for a return to PAOK was granted by his mentor, Angelos Anastasiadis and he became an integral part of the team. On 25 August 2002 he made his league debut for PAOK in a 4–1 win against Panathinaikos. He scored his first league goal in 2–3 away win against OFI.

Despite playing out of position as a right midfielder he managed to earn a place in the starting line-up, just a few months after returning from loan. Plagued with financial problems, the next season saw the club experiencing an exodus of its top players such as striker Ioannis Okkas and ex-Newcastle United forward Giorgos Georgiadis, Salpingidis, at the age of 21, then became first-choice striker and captain of the team. The 2003–04 season proved to be the best in many years, as the club finished an unexpected 3rd, qualifying for the Champions league, despite running on a very low budget. His significance for PAOK was such that in the summer 2004 he was given permission to miss a match with the Greek Olympic team so that he could participate in the UEFA Champions League qualifiers against Maccabi Tel Aviv. The elimination at the hands of the Israeli team, followed by the sack of coach Anastasiadis and subsequent financial turmoil hit the team badly, resulting in his exodus less than 2 years later. In the 2005–06 season he was top-scorer in the league with 17 goals.

Panathinaikos

In the summer of 2006, as the club's president Giannis Goumenos was desperate to cash in, he was openly chased by Olympiacos, AEK Athens and Panathinaikos. Salpingidis publicly refused the offer of bitter rivals Olympiacos, despite being the most profiting one among the three. On 16 August, after a lengthy negotiation period, he finally agreed to sign a four-year contract to Panathinaikos. He transferred for a fee of €1.8 million, with PAOK additionally receiving Sandor Torghelle, Kostas Chalarambidis and Athanasios Tsigas as an exchange. This was the third most expensive transfer between Greek teams at that time, estimated at €5 million. This transfer caused heavy turmoil amid PAOK fans, branding Salpingidis a traitor and ungrateful to the pains they had taken to keep him in the club. This tense situation brought about the demise of Goumenos' troubled presidency soon after. His debut with the greens was on 20 August 2006 in an away win with 4–1 against Egaleo where he scored three goals.

In the 2009–10 season, Salpingidis was a key player during the victorious march to the Greek championship.

Return to PAOK
After four very successful seasons with Panathinaikos (including a double-winning 2009–2010 season), in the summer of 2010 Salpingidis joined PAOK once again. On 16 June 2010, it was officially announced that he signed a four-year contract with PAOK, after his contract with Panathinaikos had expired. This club means everything for him as he explained : "I first played for the club in the 1990s and I feel very good there. My whole family and my childhood friends live in the town and I'm playing football for a team with big ambitions. PAOK are one of a select group of clubs with the most fanatical supporters in Europe. Throughout the whole of the north of Greece, people live for the team alone and nothing else."

On 9 January 2011, he scored his 100th goal in the Greek Superleague against Asteras Tripolis with a header. On 3 November 2011, Salpingidis became the Greek player with the most goals in Europe. On 30 November he scored a header, beating Heurelho Gomes, in a 2–1 win against Tottenham Hotspur at White Hart Lane, after a cross from Giorgios Georgiadis, in the Europa League.

In the start of the 2012–13 season he changed his squad number from 9 to his favourite 14. In July 2012, Fortuna Düsseldorf are in the process of trying to sign Dimitris Salpingidis from PAOK. The newly promoted Bundesliga side's general manager, Werner Wolf, claimed last week that there would be no more new arrivals at the Esprit Arena before the start of the 2012–13 campaign. However, Goal.com has learned that Fortuna are currently trying to agree a fee with PAOK for Salpingidis, who was one of the stars of Greece's surprise run to the quarter-finals of Euro 2012. The versatile attacker is on a net salary of €800,000 with his hometown club and Fortuna are not in a position to match those terms. However, they are prepared to make Salpingidis one of their highest earners and it is believed that the player is willing to take a pay cut in order to at last try his luck in the Bundesliga, having been often linked with a move to Germany in recent seasons.

In the late February and early March 2013 he was in superb form scoring 6 goals in 4 matches. On 17 March 2013 he put pen to paper on a 4-year deal to stay at the club until 2017, hoping to finish his career with his beloved team.
He scored two scissor kicks on 23 February 2013 against Kerkyra in a 3–1 home win. On 20 March 2013 he assumed the team captaincy after Pablo Garcia left the club. For the first time in his career, he received a red card in an away match against Platanias in which PAOK won 1–2. On 17 April 2013 he went on to score the winning goal in a thrilling 2–1 victory over Asteras Tripoli in the first leg of the Greek Cup semi-finals.

On 12 December 2013, Salpingidis took the field in PAOK FC's final Group L game, at home to AZ Alkmaar on Thursday, making his 67th appearance in the UEFA Cup and UEFA Europa League. Not a particularly attractive number, but one that carries a certain significance for the 32-year-old forward since it will move him up to fourth place in the competition's all-time appearances list. Two more in the round of 32 would take him level with FC Internazionale Milano's two-time UEFA Cup-winning goalkeeper Walter Zenga in third. Moreover, a third group stage goal this season would lift him to seventh in the overall scorers rankings on 24 goals, alongside Mladen Petrić and Claudio Pizarro. The tournament has played a significant role in Salpingidis's career; his maiden goal for PAOK came on his first-team debut when he was introduced as a substitute for Zisis Vryzas – now PAOK's president – in a UEFA Cup game against FC Lokomotivi Tbilisi on 30 September 1999. Meanwhile, his 100th goal for the 'Two-Headed Eagle Of The North' arrived in PAOK's first meeting with AZ of the current campaign. Oddly enough, both landmark goals were scored under Dutch coaches: Arie Haan in 1999 and Huub Stevens in 2013.

On 26 April 2014, Salpingidis unsuccessfully tried to win his second trophy with PAOK in the Greek Cup final against Panathinaikos. PAOK settled, though, and with half-time their forward forays began to carry real menace. Salpingidis had twice gone close to an equaliser, rattling the bar with a header, and, right before the interval, was millimetres away from turning in Miroslav Stoch's cross with the goal at his mercy. Eventually his club defeated by 1–4.

The 2014–15 season did not start well for the Greek international. Dimitris Salpingidis has an additional year contract with the club, but there are a few problems appeared in the season and it seems that the final discussion will take place at the end of it. On 29 May 2015, just before the Superleague Greece play-offs, the international striker made a special program due to the discomfort in his operated toe, but could not be ready to help his club in the remaining games. Salpingidis is added to the list of players who missed this season, having to play since mid-March. The 34-year-old striker was not in his best physical condition, but Giorgos Georgiadis, coach of PAOK hoped that he could be able to give some solutions, mainly because of his experience. Salpingidis will be ready to help his teammates from the beginning of next season.

On 24 August 2015, the 34-year-old Salpingidis contract at PAOK was terminated.

International career

Salpingidis has made 82 appearances and scored 13 times for the Greece national football team, including the winning goal in the away leg of the 2010 FIFA World Cup qualification play-offs against Ukraine, which sent Greece through to the final tournament. He made his debut for the national team on 17 August 2005 against Belgium.
On 17 June 2010, in a 2010 FIFA World Cup group stage match against Nigeria, he scored Greece's first ever World Cup goal with a shot from outside the area deflected off in Lukman Haruna.
On 8 June 2012, Salpingidis came on as a substitute and scored Greece's first goal in the Euro 2012 tournament, in the opening match, a 1–1 draw against Poland, becoming the first ever Greek player who scored in both the FIFA World Cup and the UEFA Euro. 
Later in the quarterfinals against Germany, he assisted Giorgos Samaras' goal and also scored the last goal with a penalty against Manuel Neuer, a match that ended 4–2, resulting Germany proceeding to the semi-finals.

Salpingidis’ next goal is to reach new international heights in Brazil three months from now, with Colombia, Japan and Côte d'Ivoire awaiting Greece as Group C opponents. “Of course, my team-mates and I are already very excited,” he explained. “We can’t wait – it’s the biggest and best tournament in the world, and it’ll be a huge football party. Every child dreams of playing at a World Cup.” The forward continued: “I hope I can enjoy it. We were in South Africa four years ago and won the first World Cup match in our history there, but we went out after the group stage. This time, our aim is to reach the last 16. We’re in a finely balanced group with no major favourites. It won’t be easy, but we can do it.” Yet Salpingidis, who with four goals from nine games was his country's second-highest scoring player in qualifying, does not want to hog the spotlight. “I’m nothing special in the team, just a part in the machine,” he stressed. “We don’t have any huge stars; we’re all the same and all have one target.”

Career statistics

Club

International

Career totals

Honours

Club
PAOK
Greek Cup: 2002–03; runner-up: 2013–14

Panathinaikos
Super League Greece: 2009–10
Greek Cup: 2009–10; runner-up: 2006–07

Individual
Gamma Ethniki Top Scorer: 2001–02
Super League Greece Top Scorer: 2005–06
Greek Footballer of the year: 2007–08, 2008–09
PAOK MVP of the Season: 2003–04, 2004–05, 2005–06

References

External links
Profile at Hellenic Football Federation 

1981 births
Living people
Association football wingers
Association football forwards
Greek footballers
Greece international footballers
Greece under-21 international footballers
Panathinaikos F.C. players
PAOK FC players
Athlitiki Enosi Larissa F.C. players
Kavala F.C. players
UEFA Euro 2008 players
UEFA Euro 2012 players
People from Thessaloniki (regional unit)
Super League Greece players
Footballers at the 2004 Summer Olympics
Olympic footballers of Greece
2010 FIFA World Cup players
2014 FIFA World Cup players